Chris Vitali (born 1974) is an American musician. Known for his flamboyant style of playing the bass guitar, Vitali has played in numerous bands in the New York City rock scene since 1990. Most notably, he was the bassist for New York City's prolific hard rock act Orange 9mm from 1995-1999. His other projects have included Hermaphrochrist, Burn, Head Assembly, and The Fuzz (not to be confused with the 1970s musical act The Fuzz).

Vitali also has many studio credits to his name, most recently working with ex-Flaw singer Chris Volz on his new solo album.

References

External links
Chris Vitali on Myspace

Living people
1974 births
Place of birth missing (living people)
Guitarists from New York City
American male bass guitarists
21st-century American bass guitarists
21st-century American male musicians